Bocaina is a municipality in the state of São Paulo in Brazil. The population is 12,452 (2020 est.) in an area of 364 km².

References

Municipalities in São Paulo (state)